The Strymon-Kulata railway is a  railway line that connects the village of Strymon in Greece with Kulata in Bulgaria. The line unites three villages on opposite sides of the border, Strymon and Promachonas in Serres, Greece, and Kulata in Blagoevgrad, Bulgaria, and is entrance/exit to the Greek rail network from Bulgaria.

History

Infrastructure
the line consists of a single line of normal width (1,435mm) with a total length of 14.5 km, made of old superstructure materials (S33B rails and S33 metal sleepers).
On the line of Strymon - Promachonas there are 2 tunnels and 5 bridges, while the transport of passengers through 2 Stations is served.

Course

The southern terminus of the Strymon–Kulata railway is Strymon on a spur from the Thessaloniki–Alexandroupoli line. At Kulata the line extends to Sofia, via Bulgariavia.

Main stations
The main stations on the Thessaloniki–Bitola railway are:
 Strymon railway station
 Promachonas railway station
 Kulata railway station

Services
The Strymon - Koulata Railway Line is an international Regional railway line between Greece and Bulgaria. 
Thessaloniki-Sofia Express Thessaloniki–Sofia
Regional services Kulata–Strymon

(Until further notice, this train is substituted for a  Rail Replacement Bus Service between Kulata on the Bulgarian side of the Greek border & Strymon on the Greek side is in operation, from where a train continues to Thessaloniki.)

See also
 Chemins de fer Orientaux

References

Further reading
 

Railway lines in Greece
Railway lines in Bulgaria
Rail transport in Bulgaria
Standard gauge railways in Greece
Ottoman railways